The Site of the First National Congress of the Chinese Communist Party is now preserved as a museum in Shanghai, China. It is located in Xintiandi, on Xingye Road (formerly Rue Wantz, in the Shanghai French Concession). It is located in the historical shikumen buildings in which the 1st National Congress of the Chinese Communist Party took place during the month of July in 1921.

The museum combines exhibits about the history of China, the history of the city of Shanghai, and the events surrounding the foundation of the Chinese Communist Party.

Transportation
The museum is accessible within walking distance south of South Huangpi Road Station of Shanghai Metro.

Gallery

See also
 National Congress of the Chinese Communist Party

References

Museums with year of establishment missing
Museums in Shanghai
Houses in Shanghai
Historic house museums in China
History museums in China
National Congress of the Chinese Communist Party
Major National Historical and Cultural Sites in Shanghai
National first-grade museums of China
Headquarters of political parties